Hannah Mathilde von Rothschild (5 March 1832 – 8 March 1924) was a German-Jewish baroness, composer and patron.

Life and career

Mathilde von Rothschild was born in Frankfurt, the second oldest daughter of Charlotte and Anselm von Rothschild, a chief of the Vienna House of Rothschild. Mathilde was talented in music and studied with Frédéric Chopin. In 1849, she married the banker Wilhelm Carl von Rothschild, a cousin of her father. The couple first resided in the Rothschild house on the Zeil (Zeilpalast), but later moved to a palace in Grüneburg, and also lived in a villa in Königstein im Taunus. They had three daughters two of whom survived childhood, Adelheid Rothschild (who married her cousin Edmond James de Rothschild) and Minna Caroline Rothschild (who married Maximilian von Goldschmidt-Rothschild). 

Von Rothschild made grants to a number of foundations including The Rothschilds' Hospital Foundation and the Georgine Sara von Rothschilds' Hospital Foundation. She also funded orphanages, sanatoriums, rest homes for the elderly, research projects for the University of Heidelberg and The Jewish Museum of Antiquities.

Von Rothschild wrote songs for singers including Selma Kurz and Adelina Patti. In 1878 she published a volume of 30 melodies in which we find two  poems by Victor Hugo: "Vieille chanson du jeune temps" and "Si vous n'avez rien à me dire" (cf. Bibliothèque nationale de France). In the late 1880s, she published a volume of twelve songs titled Zwölf Lieder für Singstimme mit Pianofortebegleitung which featured the work of several poets set to music, including poet and dramatist Franz von Dingelstedt, epic poet Friedrich von Bodenstedt, Frankfurt writer Wilhelm Jordan, Russian writer Alexey Tolstoy and French writer and librettist Paul Collin. She amassed an art collection including old masters  and also the work of popular artists including Gerard Dou, Jan Steen and Gabriel Metsu.

Recorded works
The Songs of Mathilde de Rothschild  Charlotte de Rothschild (soprano), Adrian Farmer (piano) 2CD Nimbus

References

External links
 http://www.lieder.net/lieder/get_settings.html?ComposerId=5557

1832 births
1924 deaths
19th-century classical composers
20th-century classical composers
German baronesses
Jewish classical composers
Musicians from Frankfurt
German Romantic composers
Mathilde Hannah von
German women classical composers
19th-century German composers
20th-century German composers
Women classical composers
20th-century women composers
19th-century women composers